The T55E1 3-inch Gun Motor Carriage was a prototype vehicle developed by the Allied Machinery Manufacturing Company in 1943 for the US Army. An eight-wheel drive vehicle, the T55E1 was armed with one three-inch gun in a limited traverse mounting and a supporting .50 caliber machine gun.

Development
Cook Brothers had developed an unusual vehicle for desert conditions. This had two four-wheel-drive bogies each with its own engine. Steering was by pivoting the front bogie. They then developed their design into a tank destroyer with two engines at the rear.
There was sufficient interest from the Army for a contract for development as the T55. Testing led to modifications to the pilot as the T55E1. Further testing confirmed that it was not suitable and the T55E1 was cancelled.

Power was from two Cadillac eight-cylinder water-cooled engines. Production began in 1943, however by this time preference had shifted to tracked anti-tank vehicles, and the T55E1 was cancelled.

References
 WarWheels T55E1 3-Inch 8x8 Motor Carriage retrieved on March 13, 2007
 Duncan Crow and Robert J. Icks Encyclopedia of Armoured Cars
 Haugh, David R. Searching for Perfection: An Encyclopaedia of U.S. Army T-Series Vehicle Development (1925-1958)

World War II armoured cars
World War II armored fighting vehicles of the United States